Clatford is a small hamlet (formerly a village) approximately  west of the village of Manton and about  west of Marlborough, which is the nearest town, in Wiltshire, England. It is just south of the River Kennet and the A4 primary route.

The small Clatford Priory, at times called Hullavington Priory, continued until the 15th century.

In the 14th century Clatford was comparable in size with the neighbouring village of Manton; in 1801 there were 122 inhabitants. Today Clatford is a rural community made up of Clatford Hall with Clatford Farm, several houses clustered around a crossroads and several other houses spread further out.

Clatford Hall dates from the later 16th century and is Grade II* listed.

Clatford is in the civil parish of Preshute.

References

External links

Hamlets in Wiltshire